The Phoenix Air Phoenix is a Czech shoulder-wing, two-seat motor glider, designed and produced by Phoenix Air and provided as a complete ready-to-fly aircraft.

Design and development
The Phoenix is a derivative of the Urban Air Lambada motorglider, developed by Martin Stepaneck who was formerly with Urban Air before that company's demise. The Phoenix was designed to comply with the Fédération Aéronautique Internationale microlight rules and US light-sport aircraft rules. It features a cantilever wing, a T-tail, a two-seats-in-side-by-side configuration enclosed cockpit under a bubble canopy, fixed conventional landing gear and a single engine in tractor configuration.

The aircraft is made from composites. Standard engines available are the  Rotax 912UL, the  Rotax 912ULS,  Jabiru 2200 and the  HKS 700E four-stroke powerplants. With the 912S engine the aircraft can be employed as a glider tug. An electric-powered version is under development.

The design appears on the Federal Aviation Administration's list of approved special light-sport aircraft.

Specifications (Phoenix)

See also

References

External links

2010s Czech sailplanes
Electric aircraft
Motor gliders
Single-engined tractor aircraft